The following is an episode list for the American animated television series The Huckleberry Hound Show (1958–61). Each episode of the first two seasons comprises a Huckleberry Hound cartoon, a Pixie and Dixie and Mr. Jinks cartoon, and a Yogi Bear cartoon. In seasons three and four, Hokey Wolf cartoons replace the Yogi Bear segments since he was getting his own spinoff series in 1960.

The series was originally sponsored by Kellogg's through its advertising agency, Leo Burnett. The air dates varied in each city, depending on what day and time slot the Burnett agency was able to buy. The dates for the first season below are based on when an episode aired for the first time; that was on a Monday in some cities, though the same episode would have been seen, for example, in Los Angeles on Tuesday and New York on Thursday.

Series overview
At present, the first season has been released on DVD by Warner Home Video. There are currently no plans by Warner Home Video to release the remaining three seasons (42 episodes) on DVD.

Episodes
Some episodes repeat cartoons from earlier episodes. In the following list, —rr— denotes a previously-aired (rerun) cartoon.

Season 1 (1958–59)

Season 2 (1959–60)

Season 3 (1960)

Season 4 (1961)

See also 

 List of works produced by Hanna-Barbera
 List of Hanna-Barbera characters
 The Good, the Bad, and Huckleberry Hound (1988)
 The Yogi Bear Show (1961)

References
 Episode index at the Big Cartoon DataBase

External links 
 Wing Nut Toons – List of Huckleberry Hound episodes.

Huckleberry Hound
 
Huckleberry Hound Show, The